Saint Agnes School is a private, Roman Catholic K-12 school in the Frogtown neighborhood of Saint Paul, Minnesota, United States. It is located in the Roman Catholic Archdiocese of Saint Paul and Minneapolis, and is affiliated with the Church of St. Agnes in Saint Paul.

Background
Saint Agnes School was established in 1888, and currently educates students from pre-kindergarten until 12th grade. Circa 2002 its student count was 600. In 2007 its student count was 425. That year the diocese notified the school that it may be not be viable due to declining enrollment and its debt of over $1,000,000. Two unidentified individuals gave $2,600,000 to help the school pay its debts off. By 2012 its enrollment was at 553, with 26% of them being of ethnic backgrounds other than non-Hispanic white.

Academics
Saint Agnes High School is fully accredited by the National Catholic Education Association.

Arts
Saint Agnes has a long-standing choral tradition that coincides with its Catholic identity.  The Saint Agnes Concert Chorale performs several concerts a year and tours extensively.  It also participates in state competitions regularly receiving superior ratings.  On almost a yearly basis, singers from the school are selected to participate in the All-State Choirs.

Athletics
Saint Agnes is a member of the Skyline conference of the Minnesota State High School League and competes in Section 4 A.  Boys athletics for the school include baseball, basketball, football, golf, hockey, soccer, track & field, and wrestling. Girls athletics include basketball, cheerleading, golf, hockey, soccer, softball, track and field, and volleyball. The Saint Agnes football team has recently switched from the MCAA (Minnesota Christian Athletic Association) back to the Tri-Metro Conference.

Minnesota state titles

 Basketball 1994
 Baseball 2001, 2012

References

External links
 Saint Agnes School

1888 establishments in Minnesota
Catholic secondary schools in Minnesota
Educational institutions established in 1888
High schools in Saint Paul, Minnesota
Private elementary schools in Minnesota
Private K-12 schools in the United States
Private middle schools in Minnesota
Roman Catholic Archdiocese of Saint Paul and Minneapolis